Pioneer Village is a home rule-class city in Bullitt County, Kentucky, in the United States. The population was 2,030 at the time of the 2010 census. Pioneer Village was struck by a tornado in 1996.

Geography
Pioneer Village is located in northern Bullitt County at  (38.059600, -85.677750). It is bordered by the city of Hillview to the north and west, and the city of Hebron Estates is to the south.

Demographics

As of the census of 2000, there were 2,555 people, 880 households, and 746 families residing in the city. The racial makeup of the city was 98.08% White, 0.27% African American, 0.04% Native American, 0.74% Asian, 0.31% from other races, and 0.55% from two or more races. Hispanic or Latino of any race were 0.59% of the population.

There were 880 households, out of which 45.1% had children under the age of 18 living with them, 73.0% were married couples living together, 8.8% had a female householder with no husband present, and 15.2% were non-families. 11.8% of all households were made up of individuals, and 3.6% had someone living alone who was 65 years of age or older. The average household size was 2.90 and the average family size was 3.15.

In the city, the population was spread out, with 29.5% under the age of 18, 6.9% from 18 to 24, 36.1% from 25 to 44, 22.3% from 45 to 64, and 5.3% who were 65 years of age or older. The median age was 34 years. For every 100 females, there were 93.6 males. For every 100 females age 18 and over, there were 95.0 males.

The median income for a household in the city was $55,568, and the median income for a family was $56,276. Males had a median income of $36,370 versus $25,699 for females. The per capita income for the city was $20,336. About 0.8% of families and 1.7% of the population were below the poverty line, including 3.2% of those under age 18 and 4.6% of those age 65 or over.

References

External links
City of Pioneer Village official website

Cities in Bullitt County, Kentucky
Cities in Kentucky
Louisville metropolitan area
Populated places established in 1974
1974 establishments in Kentucky